Sun Lili (born November 1961) is a Chinese engineer and the current party chief and general manager of Sinopec Engineering Incorporation.

Biography
Sun was born in Yantai, Shandong, in November 1961. She attended Muping No. 1 High School. After the resumption of National College Entrance Examination, she was accepted to China University of Petroleum. After university, she joined the Sinopec.

Honours and awards
 October 21, 2016 Science and Technology Progress Award of the Ho Leung Ho Lee Foundation 
 December 15, 2018 member of the Chemical Industry and Engineering Society of China
 November 22, 2019 Member of the Chinese Academy of Engineering (CAE)

References

1961 births
Living people
People from Yantai
Engineers from Shandong
China University of Petroleum alumni
Members of the Chinese Academy of Engineering